Angela Constance (born 15 July 1970) is a Scottish politician serving as Minister for Drug Policy since 2020, having previously served in the Scottish Cabinet from 2014 to 2018. A member of the Scottish National Party (SNP), she has been the Member of the Scottish Parliament (MSP) for Almond Valley since 2007.

Constance stood as a candidate for Deputy leader of the SNP in the party's 2014 leadership contest, but lost to Stewart Hosie.

Early life
Angela Constance was born on 15 July 1970 in Blackburn, West Lothian, the daughter of Simon Constance, a coalminer, and Mary Baird Constance (née Colquhoun). She was educated at West Calder High School and later Bo’ness Academy. 

Constance attended the University of Glasgow, where she gained an MA in Social Science. At Glasgow University, she served on the Students' Representative Council, becoming president of the council in 1991. Alastair Allan was her sabbatical vice president. She earned a Certificate of Welfare Studies from West Lothian College and an MSc in Social Work from the University of Stirling.

Before her election to Holyrood, Constance worked as a social worker and was a Councillor for West Lothian Council where she was the SNP spokesperson for children's services and lifelong learning. She also stood for the SNP in the 2005 Livingston by-election.

Political career

Training, Youth and Women's employment
During the 2014 SNP spring conference, First Minister and SNP leader Alex Salmond promoted Constance to the Scottish Cabinet in the position of Cabinet Secretary for Training, Youth and Women’s Employment. In the position, Constance was somewhat criticised by the opposition Scottish Labour Party in the Scottish Parliament, claiming that since Constance, youth unemployment in Scotland had actually risen. In response to this, Constance stated:

These figures, based on data for 2013, show that the employment prospects are improving across much of Scotland, with women’s employment driving much of this improvement. “They also show that Scotland continues to outperformed the UK across all headline labour market indicators, with a lower unemployment rate, higher employment rate and lower economic inactivity rate.

Previously, Constance was a junior Scottish cabinet member.

SNP Depute leadership bid, 2014 

Following defeat in the 2014 Scottish independence referendum, Scottish National Party leader and First Minister of Scotland Alex Salmond announced his resignation as SNP leader and First Minister of Scotland. In the aftermath of his resignation, a leadership bid was launched, and current Deputy First Minister of Scotland and SNP Depute leader Nicola Sturgeon was widely tipped to become Salmond's successor.

On 30 September 2014, Constance officially launched her bid to become the Depute leader of the Scottish National Party, competing against Stewart Hosie and Keith Brown. It was later revealed by Constance that she was "not seeking the position of Deputy First Minister".

The results of the election were announced at the SNP Autumn Conference on 14 November, with Constance losing the contest to Stewart Hosie, after being eliminated in the first round.

Cabinet Secretary for Education
Following the election of Nicola Sturgeon as the First Minister, in November 2014, Constance was promoted as the Cabinet Secretary for Education within the Scottish Cabinet.

Cabinet Secretary for Communities, Social Security and Equalities 
After the 2016 Scottish Parliament election, Nicola Sturgeon reshuffled her Cabinet. On 18 May, Constance was appointed as Cabinet Secretary for Communities, Social Security and Equalities.

Minister for Drugs Policy
In December 2020 First Minister Nicola Sturgeon sacked Joe FitzPatrick as Public Health Minister after official figures revealed that 1,264 people in Scotland had died from drugs in 2019. The number of deaths was three and a half times higher the figure for England and Wales and by some margin the highest in Europe. Sturgeon described the SNP's record on drugs as "indefensible" and Constance was given a full time ministerial portfolio with responsibility for the crisis. The appointment was not universally welcomed; journalist Alex Massie opined in The Times that: "It says something, mind you, about the depth of talent available to Sturgeon that... she felt compelled to hand the drugs brief to Angela Constance, a minister she had previously demoted. Twice."

At the Scottish Parliament election on 6 May 2021, Constance was re-elected as MSP for Almond Valley. On 19 May 2021, she was re-appointed to the new government, retaining the post of Minister for Drugs Policy.

Personal life
Constance has been married to Garry Know since 2000. After her election to Holyrood, Constance announced she was expecting her first child in October 2007.

References

External links
 

|-

|-

|-

|-

|-

1970 births
Living people
Alumni of the University of Glasgow
People from Blackburn, West Lothian
Scottish National Party MSPs
Members of the Scottish Parliament 2007–2011
Members of the Scottish Parliament 2011–2016
Members of the Scottish Parliament 2016–2021
Members of the Scottish Parliament 2021–2026
Ministers of the Scottish Government
Women members of the Scottish Government
Scottish social workers